Ice X, within physical chemistry, is a cubic crystalline form of ice formed in the same manner as ice VII, but at pressures as high as about 70 GPa. It is proton-ordered and symmetric.

Ordinary water ice is known as ice Ih, (in the Bridgman nomenclature).  Different types of ice, from ice II to ice XV, have been created in the laboratory at different temperatures and pressures. Ice X is also a very dense form of ice (2.51g/cm3).

See also
Ice for other crystalline form of ice

References

Water ice
Forms of water